Las Jilguerillas was a Mexican ranchera duo formed in the mid-1950s by sisters Imelda and María Amparo Higuera. 

They are considered icons in ranchera music, having multiple successful tours in both Mexico and the United States. They also appeared in several Mexican films.

History

Early years
Sisters Imelda and María Amparo Higuera started singing together as children and were discovered by another famous Mexican sibling duo, Dueto América, in the 1950s. They released their first official single, Chaparrita Consentida, on 5 July 1955. Almost immediately, they became a huge success, selling records both in their country and among the Hispanic population in the United States.

Later years
Their records were first arranged and produced by Gilberto Parra, and later by Cornelio Reyna, and accompanied instrumentally by various Mexican musicians. After the death of Imelda on 20 July 2004, María Amparo continued to perform until she was joined by Mercedes Castro in 2007.

The group has won a litany of awards throughout its career, including the Eréndira State Prize of the Arts in 2017. In 2018, the municipality of Numarán erected a commemorative plaque at their childhood home in Cañada de Ramírez at a ceremony attended by María Amparo.

Discography

Albums

Las Jilguerillas (1972)
Alegres De Terán (1973)
De Rancho En Rancho (1975)
Ecos Del Campo (1975)
Por Las Campiñas (1978)
El Descalzo (1979)
El Ingrato (1980)
15 Autenticos Exitos (1983)
Anda Paloma Y Dile Y Mas Exitos (1984)

Singles 

Chaparrita Consentida (1955)
Llorare Tu Ausencia (1969)
En Las Cantinas (1969)
El Bandolero (1970)
Cumpleaños (1970)
El Ultimo Adios (1971)
Con Que Me Pagas (1971)
Corrido de Nicolasa (1973)
Anda Paloma y Dile (1973)
El Novillo Despuntado (1974)
De Mi Rancho A Tu Rancho (1975)
De Rancho En Rancho (1976)
Noche Tenebrosa (1976)
Hasta Parece De Dia (1976)
Por Ninguin Motivo (1977)
El Bato Gacho (1977)
El Bracero Fracasado (1981)
Concha La Mojada (1982)
Anda Paloma y Dile (1984)
Calla Mujer Calla (1985)
Largas Se Me Hacer Las Horas (1985)

References

Ranchera singers
Mexican musical duos
Musical groups from Michoacán
Sibling musical duos
Female musical duos